The 2016 Tour de Serbie was the 56th edition of the Tour de Serbie cycling stage race. It was scheduled from 14 to 19 June.

The winner of overall classification was Matej Mugerli.

Schedule

Classification leadership

Final standings

General classification

Points classification

Mountains classification

Young riders classification

Team classification

References

External links

Tour de Serbie 2016
Tour de Serbie
Tour de Serbie